Amber Nicole Straughn (born  1979) is an American astrophysicist at NASA's Goddard Space Flight Center where she serves as the Deputy Project Scientist for the James Webb Space Telescope, responsible for science communications.  Her research focuses on interacting and star-forming galaxies in the context of galaxy assembly.
She is also the associate director of the Astrophysics Science Division.

Early life and education
Straughn was raised on a cattle and pig farm in Bee Branch, Arkansas, and also grew watermelons. The dark skies inspired her early interest in astronomy, stargazing on a blanket by her farmhouse.  When the Hubble Space Telescope was launched in 1990 while she was in elementary school, she saw videos of the event and said "I want to be part of that, part of that science story." A counselor in her high school helped her to get summer internships to help pave the way to a career in the sciences. After graduating from South Side High School in 1998, she was the first person in her family to go to college.  Straughn attended the University of Arkansas in Fayetteville, which provided her with a merit scholarship.  There, she worked with a student team to write a successful proposal for research on NASA's microgravity KC-135 plane known as the "vomit comet" in 2001.  After earning her Bachelor of Science degree in Physics in 2002, Straughn attended Arizona State University where she completed the Master of Science degree. In 2005 she was awarded the 3-year NASA Harriett Jenkins Predoctoral Fellowship for underrepresented groups in STEM. Straughn earned the PhD in Physics in 2008. Her Ph.D. thesis, Tracing galaxy assembly: A study of merging and emission-line galaxies, is on the topic of galaxy evolution using Hubble Space Telescope data.

Scientific career
Straughn is a member of the James Webb Space Telescope project science team at Goddard, where she started as a postdoc in 2008.  She became the Deputy Project Scientist for JWST Science Communications in 2011. As an early user of the newly installed Wide Field Camera 3 on the Hubble Space Telescope, Straughn demonstrated its capability to measure the distance to and properties of very faint galaxies in the early universe.  She is a Co-Investigator of the CANDELS team, conducting the largest galaxy survey project on Hubble.

Straughn is known as a passionate science communicator and has spoken at schools, astronomy clubs, museums, and research societies locally in the DC area and nationwide. The University of Arkansas awarded her an Honors Alumna status in 2017 for her scientific and outreach work. She also interacts frequently with the media, having done numerous live television interviews, media features for NASA, and has appeared on TEDx, PBS NOVA, National Geographic, DiscoveryGo, the History Channel, Spike TV, and in the Late Night with Jimmy Fallon's "Hubble Gotchu" segment.

Straughn became a pilot in 2013, flying a Cessna 182. She is an active yoga practitioner and teaches weekly yoga classes.

Awards and honors
2004, Gerald A. Soffen Memorial Fund for the Advancement of Space Science Education awardee
2005, NASA Harriet G. Jenkins Predoctoral Fellowship
2007, AAS Chambliss Student Achievement Award
2016, NASA Exceptional Achievement Medal

References

Arizona State University alumni
University of Arkansas alumni
American women astronomers
NASA astrophysicists
Living people
Science communicators
Scientists from Arkansas
People from Van Buren County, Arkansas
Women astrophysicists
1979 births